SQT or sqt may refer to:

 SEAL Qualification Training, a US Navy SEAL training course
 Sediment quality triad, an assessment tool to evaluate sediment degradation 
 Short QT syndrome, a rare genetic heart disease
 Snow Queen Trophy, ski race in Zagreb
 Soqotri language, a South Semitic language, ISO 639-3 language code sqt
 Suit Quality Test, part of hand evaluation in contract bridge